This is a list of Pennsylvania municipalities and counties with home rule charters, optional charters, or optional plans, including municipalities with home rule charters, optional charters, or optional plans.

Home rule municipalities

Most municipalities in Pennsylvania must follow state law except where the state has expressly given jurisdiction to the municipality, and are therefore subject to the Third Class City Code, the Borough Code, the First Class Township Code, the Second Class Township Code, or other acts for sui generis municipalities.

Home rule municipalities in Pennsylvania enjoy the opposite situation (i.e., they may govern themselves except where expressly forbidden by state law), and are governed according to their unique home rule charter rather than one of the above codes. While most home rule charter municipalities continue to reference their previous forms of government in their corporate names, they may also adopt a new corporate name that references a different form of government, or that omits the form from the name altogether.

Counties with home rule charters
Counties with a home rule charter may design their own form of county government, but are still generally subject to the County Code (which covers first-, third-, fourth-, fifth-, sixth-, seventh-, and eighth-class counties) or the Second-Class County Code (which covers second-class and second-class A counties). Because home rule charters primarily function to change the form of local government, and do not significantly change the relationship between a county and the state, as they do with municipalities, counties with home rule charters are still generally considered counties under state law.

Philadelphia County is unique in Pennsylvania in that it is a consolidated city-county, and so while the county is technically not governed by a home rule charter (and is therefore not included on the list), the fact that Philadelphia City (which constitutes the same land area as and administers all the governmental affairs of Philadelphia County) is a home rule municipality means that in practice the county is as well.

Optional charter and optional plan municipalities
In addition to home rule charters, two other forms of non-standard government exist in Pennsylvania: optional plans and optional charters. Optional charter forms of government were made available to third-class cities in 1957. Since 1972, it has no longer been possible to adopt these forms; however, cities already operating under these forms retain them unless they adopt another form of government. Optional plan forms of government, which operate similarly to optional charter forms of government, were made available to all municipalities and counties in 1972. They both allow the municipality to adopt a form of government that differs from the general forms that municipalities are typically subject to, but do not change the municipality's relationship with the state government. Therefore, they are still considered boroughs, third-class cities, or townships of the first or second class, respectively, under state law.

Government study commissions
The following municipalities approved questions to create government study commissions.

See also
List of municipalities in Pennsylvania
List of cities in Pennsylvania
List of counties in Pennsylvania
List of towns and boroughs in Pennsylvania
List of townships in Pennsylvania

Pennsylvania geography-related lists
Pennsylvania